Mario Šitum (born 4 April 1992) is a Croatian professional footballer who plays for Italian  club Catanzaro.

Club career
Šitum's senior career began when he was promoted from the Dinamo Academy to the first team in 2011, making his first-team debut in the same year in a 3-0 win over Czech side Sigma Olomouc. On 19 February 2011 he started and played 75 minutes in a friendly against NK Istra 1961, which Dinamo won 4-3 at the newly renovated Stadion Aldo Drosina in Pula. His first league appearance came on 26 February 2011 in Dinamo's game against Karlovac. Šitum started the match and scored in the 12th minute, a goal which turned out to be the game winner. Šitum started on a high note in the 2011-12 season, scoring the fourth goal in a 5-0 win against NK Karlovac, and then scoring twice in a 4-0 win against NK Osijek. He scored again in the next round, netting the only goal in a win against NK Lučko.

On 17 July 2014, Šitum joined Italian Serie B club Spezia on loan after a -year loan spell with NK Lokomotiva.

On 17 June 2017, he was loaned to Polish side Lech Poznań.

On 1 September 2022, Šitum signed with Catanzaro.

International career
Internationally, Šitum scored his first goals for the Croatia national under-21 football team, during qualification for the 2015 UEFA European Under-21 Championship in the match against Liechtenstein where Šitum scored the first two goals in a 4-0 win.

In May 2015 he received a call-up to the senior Croatia squad for the friendly against Gibraltar and for a Euro 2016 qualifier game against Italy. His final international was a January 2017 China Cup against the hosts.

Career statistics

Club

References

External links
 

1992 births
Living people
Footballers from Zagreb
Association football forwards
Croatian footballers
Croatia youth international footballers
Croatia under-21 international footballers
Croatia international footballers
GNK Dinamo Zagreb players
NK Lokomotiva Zagreb players
Spezia Calcio players
Lech Poznań players
Kayserispor footballers
Reggina 1914 players
Cosenza Calcio players
U.S. Catanzaro 1929 players
Croatian Football League players
Serie B players
First Football League (Croatia) players
Ekstraklasa players
Süper Lig players
Serie C players
Croatian expatriate footballers
Expatriate footballers in Italy
Croatian expatriate sportspeople in Italy
Expatriate footballers in Poland
Croatian expatriate sportspeople in Poland
Expatriate footballers in Turkey
Croatian expatriate sportspeople in Turkey